Brightspeed of Kansas, Inc., formerly United Telephone Company of Kansas, is one of several Brightspeed subsidiaries providing local telephone service in Kansas. Kansas towns that Brightspeed of Kansas serves include Junction City, Burlington, Hillsboro, and Garnett.

History
The company was founded in 1909 as The American Telephone Company. It was owned by Sprint Nextel until 2006 when it was spun off into Embarq. CenturyTel acquired Embarq in 2009, at which point United Telephone of Kansas began doing business as CenturyLink.

Sale
On August 3, 2021, Lumen announced its sale of its local telephone assets in 20 states to Apollo Global Management, including Kansas.

The sale to Apollo closed on October 3, 2022.

References

Lumen Technologies
Sprint Corporation
Telecommunications companies established in 1909
Communications in Kansas
Telecommunications companies of the United States
American companies established in 1909
1909 establishments in Kansas